The 1987 NCAA Division I baseball tournament was played at the end of the 1987 NCAA Division I baseball season to determine the national champion of college baseball.  The tournament concluded with eight teams competing in the College World Series, a double-elimination tournament in its forty first year.  Eight regional competitions were held to determine the participants in the final event.  Each region was composed of six teams, resulting in 48 teams participating in the tournament at the conclusion of their regular season, and in some cases, after a conference tournament.  The forty-first tournament's champion was Stanford, coached by Mark Marquess.  The Most Outstanding Player was Paul Carey of Stanford.

National seeds
For the first time, the NCAA selected eight national seeds and placed each in a different regional.

Bold indicates CWS participant.

Arkansas
Florida State
Georgia Tech
LSU
Oklahoma State
Pepperdine
Stanford
Texas

Regionals

The opening rounds of the tournament were played across eight regional sites across the country, each consisting of six teams. The winners of each Regional advanced to the College World Series.

Bold indicates winner.

Atlantic Regional at Coral Gables, FL

Central Regional at Austin, TX

Mideast Regional at Starkville, MS

Northeast Regional at Atlanta, GA

South I Regional at Huntsville, AL

South II Regional at New Orleans, LA

West I Regional at Stanford, CA

West II Regional at Tempe, AZ

College World Series
This was the last CWS to use a double-elimination format through the championship game. Under the format used from 1950 through 1987, the bracket was often adjusted after the field was pared to four teams in order to avoid rematches from earlier rounds. Starting in 1988 and continuing through 2002, the eight teams were divided into two four-team brackets, with the bracket winners meeting in a single championship game. In 2003, the single championship game was changed to a best-of-three series.

This CWS was best known for Stanford's dramatic 6-5 win over LSU in an elimination game. In that game, Stanford trailed 5-2 in the bottom of the 10th inning with 2 outs and nobody on base. Eventually, Freshman outfielder Paul Carey hit a walk off grand slam home run off LSU freshman (and future major leaguer) Ben McDonald to win the game.

Participants

Results

Bracket

Game results

 The Oklahoma State-LSU game was suspended overnight due to severe thunderstorms.

All-Tournament Team
The following players were members of the All-Tournament Team.

Notable players
 Arizona State: Mike Benjamin, Blas Minor, Mike Schwabe, Tim Spehr
 Arkansas: Jimmy Kremers, Mike Oquist, Tim Sherrill
 Florida State: Rafael Bournigal, Matt Dunbar, Richie Lewis, Jerry Nielsen, Deion Sanders
 Georgia: Cris Carpenter, Steve Carter, Derek Lilliquist
 LSU: Albert Belle, Mark Guthrie, Barry Manuel, Ben McDonald, Russ Springer, Jack Voigt
 Oklahoma State: Monty Fariss, Tim Pugh, Robin Ventura
 Stanford: Ruben Amaro, Paul Carey, Steve Chitren, Toi Cook, David Esquer, Brian Johnson, Brian Keyser, Mark Machtolf, Jack McDowell, Al Osuna, Ed Sprague, Ron Witmeyer
 Texas: Scott Coolbaugh, Todd Haney, Mark Petkovsek

See also
 1987 NCAA Division I softball tournament
 1987 NCAA Division II baseball tournament
 1987 NCAA Division III baseball tournament
 1987 NAIA World Series

References

NCAA Division I Baseball Championship
1987 NCAA Division I baseball season
Baseball in Austin, Texas